GEP may refer to:

 Gene expression programming
 Giant Electric Pea, a British music label
 Gifted Education Programme (Singapore)
 Global Environmental Politics, a scholarly journal
 Global Entrepreneur Programme, of the UK government
 Good engineering practice
 Growth elasticity of poverty
 Good Epidemiological Practices
 Generation expansion planning, in power engineering